The HTC MAX 4G was the world's first commercial WiMAX phone announced on the HTC website in a November 12, 2008 press release. It is based on Windows Mobile 6.1. The phone is developed by the High Tech Computer Corporation of Taiwan and is similar in looks to previously released HTC Touch HD. It is the first phone from the HTC Touch Family to incorporate GSM & WiMAX technology. The phone was only offered for the Russian market, specifically for the Yota network which was operated in Moscow, St. Petersburg, Ufa, Sochi and Krasnodar. The phone was expected to be released in April 2009 in the UK.

The phone uses a widescreen WVGA 480x800 display. and is marketed as an entertainment phone. It is also capable of VoIP communication over the WiMAX network.

Specifications

Price 
Recommended retail price was 25900 rubles (about 816 US dollars or €580 (based on the exchange rate at that time)), according to Yota's official website

References 

Windows Mobile Professional devices